Steve Roche (Stephen) (born 1964) is a New Zealand composer and performer. He is principally known for his involvement in film music and as a creator of film soundtrack and ambient music.

Early life
Roche was raised in Wellington and attended St Patrick's College, Wellington.

Composing
Plan 9 has also been involved in designing the soundtracks of the New Zealand Pavilion at World Expo Shanghai 2010.

Recording
Steve Roche and David Donaldson and Janet Roddick have been part of the eclectic Wellington music scene for over twenty-five years. They first collaborated as members of the electric 1980s band Six Volts and continued with the Brainchilds. Roche and Donaldson are involved in a band called The Labcoats with David Long, Anthony Donaldson, Riki Gooch and Toby Laing. They also comprise a band called "Thrashing Marlin". The band made a big splash in 1996 with their debut, and was followed by a second release, Garage Sailors in 1999. In 2006, they produced their third album, Wit’s end which is a collection of lo-fi, experimental pop music which ranges from a take on a Len Lye vocal sample All You've Got Someday to a Janet Roddick composition Sea of Tranquility. "The finished project is always an envelope-pushing but accessible blend of pop songwriting instincts within the sprawl of free-improvisational jazz and collage-rock. Early Split Enz and The Mutton Birds spring to mind as obvious touchstones".

References

External links
 Plan 9 website
 

1964 births
Living people
Industrial musicians
New Zealand composers
Male composers
New Zealand film score composers
Musicians from Wellington
People educated at St. Patrick's College, Wellington
Male film score composers